Brown Bluff is a rock art site in Washington County, Arkansas. The site has been estimated to date to the Mississippian period, c. AD 1100–1600. The artwork is reminiscent of artwork found in the Arkansas River valley, and is one of the few places such artwork has been found in the western Ozark Mountains.

The site was listed on the National Register of Historic Places in 1987.

See also
National Register of Historic Places listings in Washington County, Arkansas

References

Archaeological sites on the National Register of Historic Places in Arkansas
National Register of Historic Places in Washington County, Arkansas
Mississippian culture
Rock art in North America
Native American history of Arkansas